San Marcos is a Gothic church in Jerez de la Frontera, southern Spain. It was declared Bien de Interés Cultural in 1931.

The church originates from one of the six parishes founded by King Alfonso X of Castile after his conquest of the city in 1264. The current edifice  was likely started in the mid-14th century, due to the style of its polygonal apse and the Mudéjar portal, perhaps above a pre-existing mosque. The construction is anyway not documented until the middle of the 15th century, including a substantial renovation in late Gothic style.

The church has three façades, with a main entrance portal in Mannerist style (16th century). The interior has a Baroque high altar (18th century)

References

Sources

See also 
 List of Bien de Interés Cultural in the Province of Cádiz

Gothic architecture in Andalusia
Renaissance architecture in Andalusia
Marcos, Jerez
Churches in Jerez de la Frontera
Bien de Interés Cultural landmarks in the Province of Cádiz